The 1930 British Lions tour to New Zealand and Australia was the twelfth tour by a British Isles team and the fifth to New Zealand and Australia. This tour is recognised as the first to represent a bona fide British team and the first to be widely dubbed the 'Lions', after the nickname was used by journalists during the 1924 tour of South Africa.

Led by England's Doug Prentice and managed by James Baxter the tour took in 28 matches, seven in Australia and 21 in New Zealand. Of the 28 games, 24 were against club or invitational teams, four were test matches against New Zealand and one was a test match against Australia. The test match results saw the Lions lose to Australia, and win only one of the four New Zealand tests.

As with earlier trips, the selectors had a difficult time putting together the final team that made up the British Isles tour. Roughly a hundred players were approached before the 29 who eventually sailed could be chosen. Of the Lions, the players who stood out on the tour included Roger Spong, Harry Bowcott and Jack Bassett, while Ivor Jones impressed in the pack and set up a memorable try in the first game against New Zealand which gave the Lions their only test win.

Touring party
Manager: James Baxter

Full Backs
 Jack Bassett (Penarth and Wales)
 William Gordon MacGregor Bonner (Bradford)

Three-Quarters
 Carl Aarvold (Cambridge U. and England)
James "Jim" SR Reeves (Harlequins and England)
 Jack Morley (Newport and Wales)
 Anthony "Tony" L Novis (Blackheath and England)
Roy Jennings (Redruth)
 Harry Bowcott (Cambridge U. and Wales)
 Tommy Jones-Davies (London Welsh and Wales)
Paul Finbarr Murray (Wanderers and Ireland)

Half backs
 Roger Spencer Spong (Old Millhillians and England)
Wilfred "Wilf" Henry Sobey (Old Millhillians and England)
Thomas "Tom" Caldwell Knowles (Birkenhead Park)
 Howard Poole (Cardiff)

Forwards
 Doug Prentice (Leicester and England) (captain)
 Henry Rew (Blackheath and England)
 Dai Parker (Swansea and Wales)
 WB Welsh (Hawick and Scotland)
Brian Henry Black (Oxford U. and England)
Michael "Mike" Joseph Dunne (Lansdowne and Ireland)
 George Beamish (Leicester and Ireland)
 James "Jimmy" Leo Farrell (Bective Rangers and Ireland)
John McDonald Hodgson (Northern)
Henry O'Hara O'Neill (Queens and Ireland)
 Ivor Jones (Llanelli and Wales)
Harry Wilkinson (Halifax and England)
Samuel "Sam" Airey Martindale Martindale (Kendal and England)
 Douglas Kendrew (Leicester and England)
HCS Jones (Manchester and England)

Doc on One
RTÉ radio has broadcast a documentary about Mike Dunne who corresponded with a Maori princess, Rau Ellison, and sent her his Lions jersey. But their potential romance didn't happen as her family arranged a marriage for her with a neighbouring farmer. https://www.rte.ie/radio/doconone/647572-doconone-podcast-lions-rugby-tour-jersey-all-blacks-mickey-dunne-new-zealand  https://www.irishtimes.com/sport/rugby/when-the-all-blacks-had-to-wear-white-1.3137118 

There also was an article in the Irish Independent c 2005 based on Mike Dunne's diaries of the tour.

Match summary
Complete list of matches played by the British Isles in New Zealand and Australia:

 Test matches

Notes

Match details

New Zealand (First test)

Bibliography

References

1930 rugby union tours
1930
1930
1930 in Irish sport
1929–30 in English rugby union
1929–30 in Welsh rugby union
1929–30 in Scottish rugby union
1929–30 in British rugby union
1930 in New Zealand rugby union
1930 in Australian rugby union